Madushan Ravichandrakumar (born 23 December 1994) is a Sri Lankan cricketer. He made his List A debut for Kegalle District in the 2016–17 Districts One Day Tournament on 15 March 2017. In November 2021, he was selected to play for the Dambulla Giants following the players' draft for the 2021 Lanka Premier League.

References

External links
 

1994 births
Living people
Sri Lankan cricketers
Bloomfield Cricket and Athletic Club cricketers
Kegalle District cricketers
Tamil Union Cricket and Athletic Club cricketers
Cricketers from Colombo